Dehuyeh (also Romanized as Dehūyeh; also known as Dehūyeh-ye Rūnīz) is a village in Runiz Rural District, Runiz District, Estahban County, Fars Province, Iran. At the 2006 census, its population was 604, in 149 families.

References 

Populated places in Estahban County